A Man's Gotta Do is a 2004 Australian award winning film from Australian director, Chris Kennedy. The film stars John Howard.

Tagline 
Most men hold their head high, put their backs to the wall and do what they must do to give their family what they want.

Plot 

In A Man's Gotta Do, Eddy (John Howard), lives with his wife, Yvonne (Rebecca Frith), and their daughter, Chantelle (Alyssa McClelland), in a new suburb in the Illawarra part, south of Sydney.

Eddy is a fisherman by day, but by night he works as a standover man, literally a toe-cutter. Dominic, (Gyton Grantley), is his new offsider.

Chantelle is upset because her fiancé, Rudi, a Russian air conditioning specialist, has disappeared. Did her Dad have something to do with it?

The frustrated Yvonne begins flirting with Paul, the plumber, (Rohan Nicol). Eddy encourages Dominic to read his daughter's diary thinking that's the way to get a better understanding of her needs.

Reception

Reviews 
The film received Mixed reviews. Australian TV show At the Movies gave it three and a half stars. It holds a 40 metascore, with the Village voice giving it 30/100

Awards 
The film wasn't nominated for many awards but did win the only award it was nominated for, a Golden Zenith for the Best film from Oceania at the Montreal World Film Festival.

References

External links 
 

Australian comedy films
2004 films
2004 comedy films
2000s English-language films
2000s Australian films